The Parrish Avenue Bridge is a concrete girder bridge that spans the Mississippi River between Otsego, Minnesota and Elk River, Minnesota. It was built in 1985 and was designed by Toltz, King, Duval and Anderson.

The previous bridge in this location, built in 1906, was designed by C.A.P. Turner's engineering firm.  Since it could not be determined that C.A.P. Turner himself had designed the bridge, however, the old bridge was not saved or included on the National Register of Historic Places.  Despite the historic nature of the old bridge, it had deteriorated to the point where it had to be demolished in 1984.

See also
List of crossings of the Upper Mississippi River

References
 

Buildings and structures demolished in 1984
Road bridges in Minnesota
Bridges over the Mississippi River
Bridges completed in 1906
Bridges completed in 1985
1985 establishments in Minnesota
Concrete bridges in the United States
Girder bridges in the United States